The 1993 Louisville Cardinals football team represented the University of Louisville as an independent during the 1993 NCAA Division I-A football season. Led by ninth -year head coach Howard Schnellenberger, the Cardinals compiled a record of 9–3. Louisville was invited to the Liberty Bowl, where they beat Michigan State. The team played their home games in Cardinal Stadium in Louisville, Kentucky.

Schedule

Roster

Players in the NFL

References

Louisville
Louisville Cardinals football seasons
Liberty Bowl champion seasons
Louisville Cardinals football